Hugonia is a genus of plant in the family Linaceae. The genus was named by Linnaeus after Augustus Johann von Hugo (1686-1760) of Hannover.

Species include:

 Hugonia deplanchei
 Hugonia jenkinsii
 Hugonia macrophylla Oliv.
 Hugonia micans Engl.
 Hugonia mystax L.
 Hugonia planchonii Hook.f.

References

 
Malpighiales genera
Taxonomy articles created by Polbot